All Due Respect may refer to:

 "All Due Respect" (The Sopranos), an episode of The Sopranos
 "All Due Respect" (The Wire), an episode of The Wire

See also 
 With All Due Respect (disambiguation)